The 1928–29 season was Blackpool F.C.'s 28th season (25th consecutive) in the Football League. They competed in the 22-team Division Two, then the second tier of English football, finishing eighth.

Harry Evans became the club's honorary manager, succeeding Sydney Beaumont after his one season in charge.

Jimmy Hampson was the club's top scorer for the second consecutive season, with 40 goals.

Season synopsis
The league campaign began with a West Lancashire derby fixture at Preston North End. The home side won 3–1.

Blackpool's first victory didn't come until the sixth game, a 2–1 scoreline over Bristol City at Bloomfield Road.

Out of the seven games in December, Blackpool won five, which — coupled with five victories in the final eight games of the season — assisted in their eighth-place finish.

Their FA Cup campaign ended at the first hurdle, the Third Round stage, again.

Table

Notes

References

Blackpool F.C.
Blackpool F.C. seasons